Guioa multijuga is a species of plant in the family Sapindaceae. It is endemic to West Papua (Indonesia). It is a vulnerable species threatened by habitat loss.

References

multijuga
Endemic flora of Western New Guinea
Trees of New Guinea
Vulnerable plants
Taxonomy articles created by Polbot